18th London Film Critics Circle Awards
5 March 1998

Film of the Year: 
 L.A. Confidential 

British Film of the Year: 
 The Full Monty 

The 18th London Film Critics Circle Awards, honouring the best in film for 1997, were announced by the London Film Critics Circle on 5 March 1998.

Winners
Film of the Year
L.A. Confidential

British Film of the Year
The Full Monty

Foreign Language Film of the Year
Ridicule • France

Director of the Year
Curtis Hanson – L.A. Confidential	

British Director of the Year
Anthony Minghella – The English Patient

Screenwriter of the Year
Brian Helgeland and Curtis Hanson – L.A. Confidential	

British Screenwriter of the Year
Simon Beaufoy – The Full Monty

Actor of the Year
Geoffrey Rush – Shine

Actress of the Year
Claire Danes – William Shakespeare's Romeo + Juliet

British Actor of the Year
Robert Carlyle – The Full Monty, Face and Carla's Song

British Actress of the Year
Judi Dench – Mrs. Brown

British Supporting Actor of the Year
Rupert Everett – My Best Friend's Wedding

British Supporting Actress of the Year
Minnie Driver – Grosse Pointe Blank, Big Night, Sleepers

British Newcomer of the Year
Peter Cattaneo – The Full Monty

British Producer of the Year
Uberto Pasolini – The Full Monty and Palookaville

Special Achievement Award
Woody Allen
Kevin Spacey

Dilys Powell Award
Michael Caine

Lifetime Achievement Award
Paul Scofield
Martin Scorsese

External links
IMDB
Official Website

1
1997 film awards
1997 in London
1997 in British cinema